The Liberty Project is an American comic book series created by writer Kurt Busiek and artist James W. Fry.

Publication history
The Liberty Project was published by Eclipse Comics in 1987. It ran for eight issues until 1988 before its cancellation. In July 2003, About Comics reprinted the series.

They appeared later in some crossovers:
 In Total Eclipse The Seraphim Objective, a Total Eclipse one-shot tie-in.
 In Jack Kirby's TeenAgents #3, in the Secret City Saga as a part of the Kirbyverse.

Plot synopsis
The series told the story of a team of four (later five) former criminals, all of whom incidentally had super powers.  After the U.S. government quickly learns that the cost of locking up super-powered criminals is prohibitive, the original four team members—Cimarron, Crackshot, Slick, and Burnout—are offered an early parole in exchange for protecting their country against other super-powered criminals.

Members of the Liberty Project are:
Burnout (Beatrice Keogh) – the youngest member of the team, she is an angry, angst-filled teenage pyrokinetic whose powers can burn through any substance, making her nearly impossible to contain. Prior to becoming a member of the project, she was kept sedated and floating in a sensory deprivation tank at a high-security juvenile facility.
Cimarron (Rosalita Vasquez) – a feisty, hot-tempered Latina from Texas. She has super strength and limited invulnerability.  She was originally arrested for destroying the Las Vegas strip after losing her last dollar at slots.
Crackshot (Lee Alexander Clayton) – While he was arrested for a string of petty thefts and misdemeanor crimes, Crackshot's real power is the preternatural ability to hit anything he aims at; he also shows extraordinary mechanical ability, inventing a miniature particle accelerator while he was still in high school.  As the only team member who sought to rehabilitate himself, he was offered a position with the Project in order to keep him from returning to a life of crime.
Slick (Nicholas Walcek) – His name reflects both his slippery powers and his slippery personality. He is the reluctant leader, with the power to render surfaces with a very low coefficient of friction (i.e. make very slippery).  Originally he was arrested for armed larceny.
Savage (Johnny Savage) – Johnny could transform into a huge gray-skinned hulking brute with razor sharp teeth and ram's horns. He joins the Project in issue #3.

Collected editions

The series has been collected into a trade paperback:

The Liberty Project (About Comics, July 2003)

References

External links
Liberty Project at Don Markstein's Toonopedia Archived from the original on October 26, 2015.

 Liberty Project at About Comics
 Liberty Project Review, Comics Bulletin

Eclipse Comics superheroes
Comics by Kurt Busiek